Mamadou "Jimi" Mbaye is a Senegalese guitarist best known for his work with Youssou N'dour. Mbaye has developed a unique Senegalese guitar style in which he makes his Fender Stratocaster sound like local instruments such as the kora or xalam.

Style

Mbaye is different from other guitarists because of his unique style.  Youssou Ndour said "No one, no one plays guitar like Jimi Mbaye. His playing style is unique". Mbaye succeeded in transposing the African traditional sounds of khalam (Ngoni) and kora onto his electric Fender Stratocaster. Carlos Santana and Mbaye met during a tour in Los Angeles where Carlos acknowledged that: "Jimi is a very special and incredible guitarist".

Jimi has also proven to be a good singer, very melodic, a true harmonicist.

Albums

Mbaye has released three solo albums, "Dakar Heart", "Yaye Digalma" and "Khare Dounya". The latter was recorded in Jimi's new studio Studio Dogo, in which he produces other artists.

Early years

At ten years old Mbaye built his first guitar out of fishing line and gasoline cans. At twenty he'd scraped up enough money to buy a secondhand Fender Stratocaster. Mbaye was just as determined to get a guitar as he was to make it in the competitive Dakar music scene.

Early on he met Youssou N'Dour and together they became rising stars on Senegal's club scene, playing mbalax music. They created the "Super Etoile" band together in 1981 and have been musically inseparable for all these years.

Later works

Mbaye recorded six top-selling major-label albums with N'Dour before taking a leave of absence to record his own solo album, released in 1997, "Dakar Heart". Recorded at N'Dour's Studio Xippi, "Dakar Heart" features N'Dour's band "Super Etoile". Mbaye is back at N'Dour's side and is very much an integral part of Youssou's "Super Etoile" band these days. In fact, Youssou often travels abroad with only Mbaye as acoustic guitar accompanist, as he did in June, 1998 for performances in Paris as guests of Brazilian performer Gilberto Gil at the Olympia Theatre.

A member of Youssou N'Dour's Super Etoile Band since 1979, Mbaye is one of Senegal's most influential guitarists. Often compared to Jimi Hendrix and Robert Johnson, Mbaye has forged a unique blend of traditional Senegalese roots music and American pop and R&B. Recording a solo album, Dakar Heart, with help from Super Etoile Band musicians in 1997, Mbaye showcased his inventive, kora-derived guitar playing and singing in Wolof, English, and French. Billboard called him "a prodigious world talent," while Rhythm referred to him as "one of Senegal's most exciting musicians." Music has played an ongoing role in Mbaye's life. As a youngster, he performed on a self-invented instrument made from discarded garbage cans and nylon fishing line in the streets of Dakar. By the age of 20, he had graduated to a Fender Stratocaster electric guitar. Mbaye continues to be the backbone of N'Dour's band. In addition to co-writing the 1994 single "Mame Bamba," he has made valuable contributions to six N'Dour recordings. Mbaye and N'Dour have increasingly performed as a duo. In 1998, they opened the show for Brazilian guitarist Gilberto Gil at the Olympic Theater in Paris.

Mbaye is one of Africa's greatest guitarists. He has played in Youssou N'dour's Super Etoile since 1979. Now he has a solo album, Dakar Heart, on which he sings as well as plays guitar. The album is available from Shanachie Records, catalog #64094. In Europe, it's distributed by BMG France.
Dakar Heart skillfully blends Senegalese mbalax with American pop & R&B for a powerful new sound.

Collaborations

The third album called “Khare Dounya” was released in 2012. “Khare Dounya” means “Fight for Life”. He recorded this album with his band “Group Dogo”. It’s an album where Mbaye shows really his musicality. He started to tour with his band around the country (Senegal) and the West African region.

Since he had his studio Mbaye often collaborated with many artists from Africa and the rest of the world. We remember the album Daxaar with the late jazz drummer Steve Reid recorded in Mbaye’s studio Dogo in Dakar.

He’s friendly with many musicians. During gigs he would rehearse with other artists to create new songs they could record later to advance their own careers.

He often produces albums for musicians in Senegal.  And sometimes he perform with them.

Now Mbaye has quit Super Etoile de Dakar to work on his own solo career and has started to tour with his "Group Dogo", all around the world. Mbaye has rejoined Super Etoile in 2017. He played in Bercy 2017 together with Habib Faye

References 

Senegalese guitarists
Living people
Year of birth missing (living people)